CICD may refer to:
 College for International Co-operation and Development, training institute located in Hull, Yorkshire, England
 Congress for International Co-operation and Disarmament, Australian pacifist group active in opposition to the Vietnam War
 CI/CD, the combination, in software development, of continuous integration and continuous delivery

See also
 Confederation of Indian Communists and Democratic Socialists (CICDS)